This is a list of Azerbaijan football transfers in the summer transfer window 2009 by club. Only clubs of the 2009–10 Azerbaijan Premier League are included.

Azerbaijan Premier League 2009-10

Baku

In:

Out:

Gabala

In:

 

Out:

Inter Baku

In:

Out:

FK Karvan

In:

Out:

Khazar Lankaran

In:

Out:

FK Mughan

In:

Out:

Neftchi Baku

In:

Out:

Olimpik-Shuvalan

In:

 
 
 
 
 
 
 
 
 
 

Out:

Qarabağ

In:

Out:

Simurq

In:

Out:

Standard Sumgayit

In:

Out:

Turan

In:

Out:

References

Azerbaijan
Azerbaijani football transfer lists